The following lists events that happened during 1874 in Australia.

Incumbents

Governors
Governors of the Australian colonies:
Governor of New South Wales – Hercules Robinson, 1st Baron Rosmead
Governor of Queensland – George Phipps, 2nd Marquess of Normanby
Governor of South Australia – Sir Anthony Musgrave
Governor of Tasmania – Charles Du Cane
Governor of Victoria – Sir George Bowen
Governor of Western Australia – The Hon. Sir Frederick Weld GCMG.

Premiers
Premiers of the Australian colonies:
Premier of New South Wales – Sir Henry Parkes
Premier of Queensland – Arthur Hunter Palmer until 7 January, then Arthur Macalister
Premier of South Australia – John Hart until 10 November, then Arthur Blyth
Premier of Tasmania – Alfred Kennerley
Premier of Victoria – Charles Gavan Duffy until 31 July, then George Kerferd

Events
8 January – Arthur Macalister becomes Premier of Queensland for the third time.
10 March – Ernest Giles is the first European to explore and later names (12 March) the Petermann Ranges.
1 April – John Forrest leads an expedition from Geraldton, Western Australia across the Gibson Desert to the Peake telegraph station in South Australia.
15 June – Brisbane's first Victoria Bridge opens; it is lost in the 1893 Brisbane flood.
31 July – George Kerferd becomes Premier of Victoria.
28 September – Victorian Humane Society established; it later becomes the Royal Humane Society of Australasia.
6 November – University of Adelaide established by act of the South Australian Parliament; it opened in 1876.

Arts and literature
Marcus Clarke's For the Term of his Natural Life is published in book form

Sport
Southern Rugby Union is established; renamed New South Wales Rugby Union in 1892
Haricot wins the Melbourne Cup

Births
2 March – Gregan McMahon, actor and theatre director (d. 1941)
3 March – Ada Crossley, singer (d. 1929
17 September – Walter Murdoch, essayist (d. 1970)
17 October – Sir Lionel Lindsay, painter (d. 1961)

Deaths
 1 February – Alexander Harris, soldier, teacher and author (b. 1805)
 6 April – Michael Fenton, first Speaker of the Tasmanian House of Assembly (b. 1789)
 17 May – Sir Roger Therry, jurist (b. 1800)
 date unknown
 Robert Menli Lyon, Aboriginal advocate (b. 1789)

References

 
Australia
Years of the 19th century in Australia